William Chandler (1890 in Hagerstown, Maryland – 28 July 1924) was an American racecar driver.

Biography
He was born in 1890 in Hagerstown, Maryland. He died on 28 July 1924.

Indy 500 results

1890 births
1924 deaths
Indianapolis 500 drivers
Sportspeople from Hagerstown, Maryland
Racing drivers from Maryland